The Museo del Concorde was a museum located in Ciudad Juárez, Chihuahua, México dedicated to and housing parts of the Franco-British supersonic airliner Concorde, which was retired in 2003. The museum was in operation from 2004 to 2013.

History

In 2004, many original components used for maintenance and operation of the Concorde were acquired through the Dovebid agency and transported by ABELS.

The aircraft components housed at El Museo del Concorde weigh more than 10 tonnes. They were brought from Birmingham, England, to Houston, Texas, by water, which took 30 days. They were then brought to Ciudad Juárez in three trucks.

The museum was operated by students of Aeronautical Engineering from the Universidad Autónoma de Ciudad Juárez.

It closed in 2013 and the exhibits were transferred to a warehouse.

Objectives

The museum's objectives were to provide information on the Concorde, and also to preserve its memory not just as a simple aircraft, but as a complex piece of engineering.

Exhibition

The museum housed approximately 120 components, including a Rolls-Royce/Snecma Olympus 593 engine, a Snecma twin intake, control columns, seats and the left landing gear.

See also
List of aerospace museums

References

External links 

 Official website, archived in September 2013 

Aerospace museums in Mexico
Concorde
Ciudad Juárez
Museums in Chihuahua (state)
Defunct museums
Museums established in 2004
Museums disestablished in 2013
2004 establishments in Mexico
2013 disestablishments in Mexico